Debbi Fields  (born September 18, 1956) is the founder and spokesperson of Mrs. Fields Bakeries. She has written several cookbooks and makes cookies. A resident of Memphis, Tennessee for over 16 years since she remarried in 1997, she moved to Nashville in 2014. Her late husband, Michael David Rose, was the former CEO/Chairman of Holiday Corp. and Harrah's Entertainment, Inc. He died of cancer on April 2, 2017, at the age of 75.

Mrs. Fields Cookies operates in over 250 locations.

Family  
Debra Jane Sivyer was born in Oakland, California. Her father was a welder for the Navy and her mother was a housewife. She is the youngest of five daughters.

In the 1970s, the Oakland Athletics introduced "ball girls" (young girls who would sit in foul territory near the baselines to retrieve baseballs grounded foul by batters) to the team. Sivyer, with the help of a sister who at the time was a secretary at the A's offices, was one of the first ones he hired. She was paid five dollars an hour and would use the money to buy ingredients for what would become her famous cookies. She instituted a "milk-and-cookies" break for the umpires.

In 1974, Sivyer graduated from Alameda High School, California at the age of 17. She was also voted homecoming queen her senior year.  She attended Foothill College, a community college in Los Altos Hills, California, for two years.

In 1976, at the age of 19, Sivyer married 29-year-old Stanford graduate Randall Keith Fields (MA, Political Science, 1970), founder in the early 1970s of the financial and economic consulting firm Fields Investment Group, taking the name she would soon use for her business.

Fields began her business in 1977 in Palo Alto, California, and at its height franchised 650 retail bakeries in the United States and over 80 in 11 different countries.

Fields and her husband had five daughters, Jessica, Jenessa, Jennifer, Ashley, and McKenzie, but divorced in 1997. On November 29, 1997, she married Michael Rose. One of her five stepchildren from her marriage to Rose, Gabrielle Rose, swam for Brazil at the 1996 Summer Olympics.

Fields began franchising in 1990, and, though she sold the business to an investment group in the early 1990s, she remains the company's spokesperson.

The History Channel included Mrs. Fields Cookies in their third season (S3E6) of The Food That Built America series.

References

External links
 Entrepreneur's Hall of Fame: Debbi Fields
 MrsFields.com
 History Channel - Foods That Built America

1956 births
Living people
Businesspeople from Oakland, California
Writers from Oakland, California
Writers from Tennessee
People from Memphis, Tennessee
American chief executives of food industry companies
American women chief executives
American cheerleaders
Foothill College alumni
Palo Alto, California
20th-century American women
21st-century American women